A pentacycle ("hen and chickens" ) is a human-powered five-wheeled vehicle.

Origin 
The original pentacycle was designed and patented by the architect Edward Burstow in 1882. It had a large central wheel directly driven by pedals like a penny farthing bicycle, with a "bath-chair type handle", and four smaller wheels for stability. This arrangement led to it being referred to as the "hen and chickens" cycle, as it resembled a mother hen surrounded by her four chicks.  It was trialled by rural postmen in Horsham and, although liked, the design was not widely adopted. There is a replica in the British Postal Museum.

Modern-day interpretation 
Modern day pentacycles do not often share the same layout as the original pentacycle, usually using various other wheel configurations.

A 2002 interpretation, specifically designed to use the disused Aérotrain monorail track near Orléans, is more accurately described as a tricycle; although it has five wheels, two are actually used for guidance and are placed on either side of the monorail support.

References

See also 
 Unicycle
 Bicycle
 Tricycle
 Quadricycle
 List of land vehicles types by number of wheels

Cycle types